Guotaiqiao Township is an rural township in Cili County, Zhangjiajie, Hunan Province, People's Republic of China.

Administrative division
The township is divided into 10 villages and 1 community, the following areas: Guotaiqiao Community, Xingming Village, Linkuang Village, Guangkou Village, Leiyan Village, Shuanghe Village, Daojie Village, Yangping Village, Baihe Village, Fenghe Village, and Xinyuan Village (国太桥社区、星明村、磷矿村、广口村、雷岩村、双合村、道街村、杨坪村、白鹤村、凤鹤村、新源村)

References

Former towns and townships of Cili County